Caryocolum mazeli is a moth of the family Gelechiidae. It is found in the Alps and Pyrenees of Andorra and southern France.

The wingspan is about 11 mm.

The larvae possibly feed on Dianthus and/or Petrorhagia species.

References

Moths described in 2005
mazeli
Moths of Europe